Laetilia hebraica is a species of snout moth in the genus Laetilia. It was described by Joseph de Joannis in 1927. It is found in Mozambique.

References

Endemic fauna of Mozambique
Moths described in 1927
Phycitini
Lepidoptera of Mozambique
Moths of Sub-Saharan Africa